Homalium henriquesii is a species of plant in the family Salicaceae. It is endemic to São Tomé and Príncipe.

References

Flora of São Tomé Island
Flora of Príncipe
henriquesii
Near threatened plants
Taxonomy articles created by Polbot